Mary Annella Zervas (7 April 1900 – 14 August 1926) was a Benedictine nun who died after a three-year battle with the skin disease Pityriasis rubra pilaris. Prior to the 1960s, Sister Annella's grave in St. Joseph, Minnesota was considered a place of pilgrimage.

Early life
Anna Cordelia Zervas was born in Moorhead, Minnesota on 7 April 1900. Her father, Hubert Zervas, an immigrant from the village of Immekeppel, in the German Empire, was a butcher and ran a local meat market. Her mother, Emma (née Levitre) Zervas, was born in Saint-Theodore-d'Acton, Quebec.

Zervas was raised in a large family which attended St. Mary's Roman Catholic Church in Moorhead, where her father was the choir director and a member of the Knights of Columbus. At the time, the parochial school from St. Mary's was looked after by priests and nuns of the Benedictine Order. According to Alfred Mayer, who was then Pastor of St. Mary's,

She sought only to please God and do His Holy Will in all things, and thence labored but for God's honor and glory. ... It was during the summer vacation of 1915 that she one day called on me and expressed to me her desire of going to the convent at St. Joseph and becoming a sister. I told her that I thought she had a religious vocation and advised her to carry out her holy design. She seemed to be so convinced of her religious vocation that she expressed no doubts or fears regarding it. After I had spoken some words of encouragement and explained to her, in short, the excellence of the religious state, she left happy and contented.

Hubert and Emma Zervas were reportedly very reluctant to part with their daughter at such a young age. Mayer, however, advised them, "Don't put anything in her way; she is not too young to give herself to God." Hubert Zervas wrote several years later that he and his wife had then "gladly consented to give back the child to Him from Whom they had received her."

Benedictine Order

Zervas entered Saint Benedict's Monastery as a postulant in 1915 and entered the novitiate in 1918. She would be remembered as a quiet and unassuming nun who was fond of reading The Following of Christ by Geert Groote.

On June 17, 1918, she received the habit in a ceremony conducted by Bishop Joseph Francis Busch of St. Cloud, Minnesota. According to James Kritzeck, "This was the day which Anna had so eagerly awaited; in a simple, beautiful ceremony, she exchanged an elegant bridal gown for the severe religious habit.... Anna rushed to tell her parents her new religious name, Sister Mary Annella. Her mother remarked, not unkindly, 'But there is no Saint Annella,' to which Sister Annella, concealing her slight disappointment at this reaction to the name by which she would henceforth be known, replied, 'Then I shall have to be the first one!'" She took her final vows in 1922 and was assigned as a music teacher and organist to St. Mary's Convent in Bismarck, North Dakota.

Affliction
During the summer of 1923, Zervas noticed a small reddish-brown patch on her arm which itched terribly, and her body began to swell.

In April 1924, her parents were summoned to her hospital bedside. Initially, her mother didn't recognize her, and thought she gone to the wrong room. According to the nun Mary De' Pazzi Zervas, "Her hair was nearly all gone and her face looked terrible, blotchy." After their shock wore off, her parents remained with her two days.

In June 1924, Zervas was transferred to the Mayo Clinic in Rochester, Minnesota, where she was diagnosed with Pityriasis Rubra Pilaris. At the time, there was neither a cure nor specific treatment. According to Brendan D. King,

P.R.P., as it is known for short, is an inherited disease usually passed down from parent to child. In the most serious cases, the skin becomes overactive and is unable to regenerate. The blood vessels dilate, which causes the body to hemorrhage moisture. This leaves the weakened immune system quite vulnerable to secondary infections. In some cases, P.R.P. can be fatal. After her diagnosis, Sister Annella was transferred to the Worrell Hospital, where all skin diseases were treated. She was given a great deal of rest and fed a special diet consisting mainly of fish and vegetables. Every one of her nurses expressed revulsion at the task of changing her bandages and asked to be reassigned. There was little improvement, however. Sister Annella's skin had grown so sensitive that lukewarm water seemed scalding hot. By the beginning of June, a grayish purple coloring began spreading outward from her face. Even hot packs could not stop her teeth from chattering. With the period of examination over, Sister Annella was transferred to St. Raphael's Hospital in St. Cloud.
 
Dermatologist Dr. Elizabeth Blixt, suggests that it is possible that Zervas's underlying illness may have led to erythroderma, a complication which could have contributed to her death. "Erythroderma causes the entire body to become red and inflamed, and the skin often becomes flaky. What can happen is that (the erythroderma) messes with the body's heat regulators. It can cause the body to lose a lot of heat, which makes you more susceptible to infections. It can also cause electrolyte imbalances that can lead to other things, like heart arrhythmia."

During the worst fits of pain, Zervas would repeat, "Yes, Lord, send me more pain, but give me strength to bear it."

Decline and death
In the summer of 1924, Hubert and Emma Zervas paid a visit to Louise Walz, the abbess of St. Benedict's. When it became apparent that her condition was terminal, Zervas was taken home to Moorhead. The abbess was kept apprised of Zervas's condition and the nuns of Moorhead visited regularly.

In the fall of 1924, careful dieting and osteopathic treatments brought about a remission of Zervas's symptoms. Her family was certain that it was only a matter of time before Zervas experienced a complete cure. Zervas, however, was unconvinced. She told her mother, "When this disease leaves me, God will have taken it away and he will not want me to have it anymore. I do not want anything but what God wills."

Zervas also said, "What He has in store for me, I do not know, but all He does is well, so there is no need to worry. God has given me the grace to be resigned, and I thank him heartily for this, but also for all else He has given me with my illness.... I often wonder what great harm of body or of soul I may have suffered had not God given me this 'blessing in disguise'."

In the summer of 1926, Zervas was attacked by a fit of pain immediately after leaving the confessional. Over the days that followed, the disease and its symptoms returned full force. As a novena was offered for her at Our Lady of Victory Basilica in Lackawanna, New York, her condition seemed to enter its final phase. Death occurred at 3:15 a.m. on the Vigil of the Feast of the Assumption of the Blessed Virgin Mary, Saturday, August 14, 1926. After a Roman Catholic requiem mass at her parents' parish church in Moorhead, Zervas's remains were transported to St. Benedict's and buried in the convent's cemetery.

Legacy
According to a 1989 newspaper article, within seven months of her burial at St. Benedict's Convent, Bishop Joseph Busch was hearing rumors of cures and favors granted through Zervas's intercession. He asked the priest Alexius Hoffmann of St. John's Abbey to collect information on "the circumstances of her sickness and death and the origin and progress of the cultus, if any, in her regard and any evidences there may be of miraculous intervention through her intercession."

In April 1927, Hoffman reported to Busch that five cures had been reported. He also submitted a biographical sketch written by Zervas's parents. While there is no evidence that Bishop Busch took further steps in the case, devotion to Zervas spread through the efforts of her father and a priest from St. John's Abbey, Joseph Kreuter, who wrote a short sketch of Zervas's life entitled An Apostle of Suffering in Our Day."  This account first appeared in the Josephinum Weekly, published at that time in Columbus, Ohio, and reprinted in other Cather publications. In 1931, it was re-issued as booklet and subsequently printed in a number of translations. A second edition of the English booklet, published by Saint John's Abbey Press, followed in 1946. Writing in 1957, Dr. James Kritzeck declared, "Whatever may happen, everyone can pray to her and have confidence in her intercession."

According to the Visitor, the official newspaper of the Roman Catholic Diocese of Saint Cloud: "While the St. Paul Daily News exaggerated when it reported that "thousands" were visiting her grave, there were some pilgrims to the convent cemetery, and many of them took a handful of dirt from Sister Annella's grave for a souvenir. Interest in Sister Annella dwindled during the 1960s, but she still has some fans. At least one of them, no one seems to know who, puts flowers on her grave regularly.

In a 2008 interview with "The Record," a newspaper published by the College of Saint Benedict and Saint John's University, local historian Sister Owen Lindblad, OSB alleged that sightings of Zervas were often reported near the convent cemetery by St. Benedict's students in need of "a shoulder to cry on or a little advice".

A spokesperson for the Diocese of St. Cloud indicated that as of 2017, a cause for the canonization of Zervas had not been opened, nor was one anticipated. While the Benedictine sisters have complied with requests for relics, and memorial cards, it is not the policy of the Benedictines to promote canonization procedures for one of their members. According to Sister Karen Rose, OSB, while the Benedictine Sisters are not against canonizations, "Under the Rule of St. Benedict, humility is a very central concept,... The idea of promoting one of our own is really kind of alien to us."

References

Bibliography
 King, Brendan D., "The Apostle of Suffering: The Life and Death of Minnesota's Un-Canonized Saint," Catholic Family News, December 2008, pp. 1, 23–26.
 Kreuter, O.S.B., Very Reverend Joseph, "Sister M. Annella Zervas, O.S.B.; An Apostle of Suffering in Our Day," St. Meinrad Archabbey, 1928.
 Kritzeck, James, "Ticket for Eternity: The Life of Sister Annella Zervas, O.S.B.," St. John's Press, 1957.

External links
 Mentions of Annella Zervas in Vivarium, the College of Saint Benedict/Saint John's University Digital Image Collection; accessed May 5, 2015. 
 Joseph Pearce on Sister Annella Zervas, O.S.B., staustinreview.org; accessed Sep 21, 2015.
 Sister Annella Zervas profile, findagrave.com; accessed May 5, 2015.

1900 births
1926 deaths
American venerated Catholics
People from Moorhead, Minnesota
American Servants of God
People from Bismarck, North Dakota
Benedictine nuns
American people of German descent
American people of French-Canadian descent
20th-century venerated Christians
20th-century American Roman Catholic nuns
Catholics from Minnesota
Catholics from North Dakota